Bruce Edward Nankervis (born 14 August 1950) is a former Australian rules footballer in the Victorian Football League for Geelong Football Club. He wore the number 33 during his tenure at the club.

Nankervis was awarded the Carji Greeves Medal in 1973 and 1974 and captained the club in 1976 and 1977 before he broke a bone in his neck that required him to travel to the United States for treatment. Nankervis was named in the Australian Rules team of the decade as a Half-Back. His older brother Ian took over the captaincy in 1978.

References

External links

Carji Greeves Medal winners
Geelong Football Club players
Geelong Football Club captains
Australian rules footballers from Geelong
1950 births
Living people